Alice Burke (born 3 October 2002) is an Australian rules footballer who plays for St Kilda in the AFL Women's (AFLW).

Her debut game was a victory against the Bulldogs in the opening round of the 2021 AFLW season. It was revealed Burke had signed on with the Saints for two more years on 30 June 2021, tying her to the club until the end of the 2022/2023 season.

She was educated at Haileybury College.

References

External links
 
 

Living people
2002 births
St Kilda Football Club (AFLW) players
Sandringham Dragons players (NAB League Girls)
Australian rules footballers from Victoria (Australia)
Sportswomen from Victoria (Australia)